Ziminella is a genus of sea slugs, specifically aeolid nudibranchs, marine gastropod molluscs in the family Paracoryphellidae.

Species 
Species within the genus Ziminella are as follows:
 Ziminella circapolaris Korshunova, Martynov, Bakken, Evertsen, Fletcher, Mudianta, Saito, Lundin, Schrödl & Picton, 2017
 Ziminella japonica (Volodchenko, 1941)
 Ziminella salmonacea (Couthouy, 1838)
Ziminella vrijenhoeki Valdés, Lundsten & N. G. Wilson, 2018

References

Paracoryphellidae